Allophylus rapensis is a species of plant in the family Sapindaceae. It is endemic to French Polynesia.

References

Flora of French Polynesia
rapensis
Data deficient plants
Taxonomy articles created by Polbot